The Pink Panther in: Pink at First Sight is a 1981 animated Valentine's Day special starring The Pink Panther, that premiered on ABC on February 14, 1981. This was not only Marvel's lone Pink Panther cartoon but was David H. DePatie's first solo effort on the character without Friz Freleng's involvement and the third and final Pink Panther special on ABC, following A Pink Christmas in 1978 and Olym-Pinks in 1980.

Plot 
(In parody of Love at First Sight) It is Valentine's Day and the Pink Panther is lonely and has no money (except for seven cents). After receiving another person's Valentine gift package by mistake, he goes to the messenger service for a job but messes his rehearsal up. He then goes to a store, buys a cassette player and pre-recorded cassettes with the seven cents he had left and goes back to the messenger service miming to Enrico Caruso's version of "Vesti la giubba", an aria from Ruggero Leoncavallo's opera Pagliacci, and gets hired as a messenger.

Antics on the job entangle the breezy cat with a jealous husband (after stealing the heart of his housewife whilst miming a 50s-ish sounding ballad), a snobby classic violinist (after using a Stradivarius violin like an electric guitar; the Panther had the wrong recording on at the time), a priest (whom the Panther had delivered the wrong present to) and a crime boss named Big Joe and tough gangsters (their present was a bomb).

Finally, after warding off Big Joe and his gang with a cassette containing excerpts of a police radio show, our hero is sitting alone and discouraged on a park bench when he finally meets the pantheress of his dreams, the ideal feline valentine.

Voice Talents of 
 Frank Welker - The Jester, Messenger Owner, The Man with the Golf Club, Violinist, Customer
 Marilyn Schreffler - Baby's Mother, The Lady with the Umbrella, Nurse, Housewife, Maid
 Hal Smith - Big Joe
 Brian Cummings - Music Store Owner, Tough Gangsters
 Weaver Copeland - Announcer

Home media
Pink at First Sight made its VHS debut release by MGM/UA Home Video sometime during the 1980s. On November 6, 2007, the special alongside Olym-Pinks and A Pink Christmas was released as part of the DVD collection set The Pink Panther: A Pink Christmas from MGM Home Entertainment and 20th Century Fox Home Entertainment (until June 30, 2020).

Production 
Most of the animation staff utilized for 1978's The All New Pink Panther Show worked on Pink at First Sight, which also utilized several music cues from the series as well but unlike that program, a laugh track was not featured. Freleng was absent from this production due to him breaking up the studio he began with DePatie before returning to Warner Bros. Many of the other characters' voices for this special were done by Frank Welker, Marilyn Schreffler, Hal Smith, Brian Cummings and Weaver Copeland.

Trivia 
Marvel also produced the new opening and ending animation for Trail and Curse of the Pink Panther, written and directed by Art Leonardi.

References

External links 
 

1981 television specials
The Pink Panther (cartoons) television specials
Television specials by Marvel Productions
Television specials by DePatie–Freleng Enterprises
1980s American television specials
American Broadcasting Company television specials
Valentine's Day television specials